Steers is a surname. Notable people with the surname include:

Alfred E. Steers (1860–1948), American city magistrate and politician
Barry Steers (1927–2011), Canadian diplomat
Burr Steers (born 1965), American actor
Edward Steers, Jr., American historian
Edwin K. Steers (1915-1992), American politician
George Steers (1815–1856), American yacht designer
Henry Steers, American shipbuilder
Henry Steers (1832) (1832–1903), American shipbuilder
Hugh Auchincloss Steers (1963–1995), American painter
 James Alfred Steers (18991987), British geographer and author
James Rich Steers (1808–1896), American yacht builder
Larry Steers (1888–1951), American actor
Newton Steers (1917–1993), American Republican politician
Thomas S. Steers (1804–1884), American police officer
Thomas Steers (1672–1750), English civil engineer
 William D. Steers (born 1955), American urologist

See also 
 Steers (disambiguation)